Phaenacropista cremnotoma is a species of moth of the  family Tortricidae. It is found on Java in Indonesia.

References

	

Moths described in 1936
Archipini